Sericolea is a genus of flowering plants belonging to the family Elaeocarpaceae.

Its native range is New Guinea.

Species:

Sericolea arfakensis 
Sericolea brassii 
Sericolea calophylla 
Sericolea chrysotricha 
Sericolea collinsii 
Sericolea coodei 
Sericolea decandra 
Sericolea gaultheria 
Sericolea gracilis 
Sericolea leptophylla 
Sericolea micans 
Sericolea novoguineensis 
Sericolea ovalifolia 
Sericolea pachyphylla 
Sericolea papuana 
Sericolea pullei 
Sericolea ridleyana 
Sericolea salicina

References

Elaeocarpaceae
Elaeocarpaceae genera